2069 is a year in the 2060s decade

2069 may also refer to
 The year 2069 BC in the 21st century BC
2069 (number), the number 
2069 (album), 2000 album by 69Boyz
2069 Hubble, a main-belt asteroid
Tubize 2069, a Belgian preserved steam locomotive
2069 AD (video game), an X68000 video game